Sir Thomas Henley KBE (4 February 1860 – 14 May 1935) was an Australian politician, elected as a member of the New South Wales Legislative Assembly.

Early years
Henley was born in Wootton Bassett, Wiltshire, England and after basic education worked in the building industry for about ten years until he migrated to Sydney in about 1884.  He married Charlotte Smith in 1886.  He became a property developer and continued to build up his business during the depression of the 1890s, including acquiring Sydney Harbour ferry companies.  He was an alderman for Drummoyne Council from 1898 to 1934, including four periods as Mayor.

Political career
Henley was elected to the Legislative Assembly in 1904 representing Burwood as a member of the Liberal Reform Party, Nationalist Party and United Australia Party until 1935, except for the period of proportional representation (1920–1927), when he was a member for Ryde. He had a forthright parliamentary style, boasting of his own success and the merits of hard work. Opponents called him the "great 'I am".

He was a member of the Metropolitan Water Sewerage and Drainage Board, commonly known as the Water Board, for much of the time between 1903 and 1933.

He was very briefly appointed as Minister for Public Works and Minister for Railways and Housing, on two occasions, in 1921 and 1922.

Henley fell from a Manly ferry and drowned on 14 May 1935 amid rumours of suicide. He was survived by his wife, two daughters and a son Herbert, who was a member of the Legislative Council from 1937 to 1964.

References

1860 births
1935 deaths
Members of the New South Wales Legislative Assembly
Australian Knights Commander of the Order of the British Empire
Australian politicians awarded knighthoods
People from Royal Wootton Bassett
English emigrants to Australia
Deaths by drowning in Australia